Laura Elisabeth Christensen (born 26 January 1984) is a Danish actress.

Biography 
Laura Christensen made her debut as a child actor in the film Min fynske barndom and had her first major role in Tøsepiger.

She is perhaps best known for her roles in the TV series Riget (playing the brain damaged girl Mona), Strisser på Samsø and TAXA.

In 2005 she was nominated for a Robert for best supporting actress for her portrayal of a teenage mother in Paprika Steen's Aftermath.

Christensen is married to actor Thomas Levin.

Filmography (selected) 
2013 - All for Two
2011 - A Funny Man
2009 - Oldboys
2008 - The Candidate
2007 - The Killing, series
2006 - Life Hits
2004 - Kongekabale
2003 - Midsommer
1997 - Riget 2, miniseries
1996 - Tøsepiger
1994 - Riget, miniseries
1994 - Min fynske barndom

References

External links 
Laura Elisabeth Christensen at Den danske film database

1984 births
Actresses from Copenhagen
Danish film actresses
Danish television actresses
Living people